F Street or "F" Street is the sixth of a sequence of alphabetical streets in many cities.
 
It may refer to:
F Street (Washington, D.C.), including about F Street and 7th Street shopping districts
F Street and H Street Loop (Bakersfield and Kern Electric)
F Street Bridge (disambiguation), relating to F Streets of Salida, Colorado and of Palouse, Washington)

See also
F Street House, George Washington University's president's home, Washington, D.C.